Pianki may refer to the following places:
Pianki, Masovian Voivodeship (east-central Poland)
Pianki, Podlaskie Voivodeship (north-east Poland)
Pianki, Warmian-Masurian Voivodeship (north Poland)